Zabari or Zebari or Zobari may refer to:
 Zabari 1, Khuzestan Province
 Zabari 2, Khuzestan Province
 Zabari, Razavi Khorasan